The 2017 Tampa Bay Buccaneers season was the franchise's 42nd season in the National Football League, the 20th playing their home games at Raymond James Stadium and the second under head coach Dirk Koetter.

On March 9, 2017, the Buccaneers signed former Washington Redskins wide receiver DeSean Jackson, defensive tackle  Chris Baker, former Dallas Cowboys safety J. J. Wilcox (traded to Pittsburgh Steelers), former New York Jets kicker Nick Folk, and veteran quarterback Ryan Fitzpatrick.

The team's Week 1 game against the Miami Dolphins was rescheduled to November 19 due to Hurricane Irma. Week 11 was originally the two teams' bye week. Week 1 would become the bye week for both teams and they would not play until Week 2. This was first time since the Arizona Cardinals in 2001 in which a team had a bye week in Week 1.

The Buccaneers were hampered with poor performance and an early kicking situation, as they failed to improve or match their 9–7 record from the previous season. After a loss to the Detroit Lions on December 10, 2017, they were mathematically eliminated from the playoffs with a 4–9 record. The Bucs finished the season 5-11. This was their tenth consecutive season without a playoff appearance, with their last being in the 2007 season. Also, the Bucs finished last in the NFC South for the seventh time in nine seasons.

The preseason was documented on HBO's Hard Knocks.

Offseason

Signings

Departures

Acquisitions
The first transactions of the year occurred shortly after the conclusion of the 2016 regular season on January 2, 2017, when the Buccaneers signed offensive lineman Josh Allen, safety Isaiah Johnson, offensive lineman Mike Liedtke, cornerback Cody Riggs, running back Blake Sims, and tight end Tevin Westbrook to reserve/futures contracts.

On January 4, the Bucs signed tight end Kivon Cartwright and kicker John Lunsford to reserve/futures contracts. On January 5, the Bucs signed Edmonton Eskimos wide receiver Derel Walker, Saskatchewan Roughriders Jeff Knox Jr and guard Jarvis Harrison.

On September 3, the club signed T. J. Ward, previously with Denver, for a one-year deal worth $5 million.

2017 NFL draft

Pre-draft

Draft

Staff

Final roster

Preseason

Regular season

Schedule

Note: Intra-division opponents are in bold text.

Game summaries

Week 2: vs. Chicago Bears

After a bye in Week 1 due to Hurricane Irma, Tampa Bay began their season in Week 2 against Chicago. Jameis Winston threw for 204 yards and 1 touchdown pass to Mike Evans, as the Buccaneers routed the Bears 29–7. Bears quarterback (and former Buccaneer) Mike Glennon lost a fumble, and threw two interceptions, one of which was returned for a touchdown.

Week 3: at Minnesota Vikings

Before the game, wide receivers Mike Evans and DeSean Jackson kneeled during the national anthem after comments made by president Donald Trump about national anthem protests two days prior. The Vikings jumped out to a 28–3 lead by the third quarter, while the Buccaneers defense could not contain Case Keenum, who threw for 369 yards and three touchdown passes. After quarterback Jameis Winston threw his second interception, a frustrated Evans was seen kicking over the ice tub on the sidelines. Minnesota held on to top Tampa Bay by the final score of 34–17.

Week 4: vs. New York Giants

Jameis Winston threw for 332 yards and three touchdown passes, but Tampa Bay found themselves trailing by a point late in the fourth quarter to the New York Giants. Tampa Bay jumped out to a 13–0 lead in the first quarter, but kicker Nick Folk missed an extra point and later missed two field goal attempts. The Giants took a 23–22 lead with 3:16 remaining in regulation after a 2-yard touchdown pass from Eli Manning to Rhett Ellison. In the final three minutes, Winston drove the Buccaneers to the Giants' 16-yard line. Folk kicked a 34-yard field goal just inside the left upright as time expired, and Tampa Bay won 25–23.

Week 5: vs. New England Patriots

The Tampa Bay defense played significantly better, picking off Patriots quarterback Tom Brady (his first interception of the season) and getting a sack fumble. Running back Doug Martin returned from his suspension, and had a productive showing, rushing for 74 yards on 14 carries and scoring a touchdown. However, the Tampa Bay offense mostly struggled through the first three-quarters. Meanwhile, Buccaneers kicker Nick Folk struggled mightily, missing on all three of his field goal attempts. Late in the fourth quarter, Jameis Winston threw a touchdown pass to tight end Cameron Brate, making the score 16–14 with just over two minutes left in regulation. After a failed onside kicked, the Patriots scored a field goal putting themselves up by five. The Buccaneers got the ball back with 1:10 remaining, and zero timeouts left. Winston drove the Buccaneers to the New England 18-yard line with 3 seconds to go. Winston's pass to O. J. Howard in the endzone as time expired fell incomplete, ending the team's six-game home winning streak. After missing six kicks since the Giants game (five field goals and one extra point), kicker Nick Folk was placed on injured reserve.

Week 6: at Arizona Cardinals

The Buccaneers started off horribly, both offensively and defensively as the Cardinals scored early. Five days earlier, veteran running back Adrian Peterson had been traded to Arizona from the Saints. Peterson started his first game for the Cardinals, scoring on the opening drive. Down 24–0 in the second quarter, Jameis Winston was sidelined with a shoulder injury and was replaced by backup quarterback Ryan Fitzpatrick. Winston would not return. After Fitzpatrick threw an interception early in the third quarter, the Cardinals scored again taking a 31–0 lead. The Buccaneers mounted a comeback, outscoring the Cardinals 33-7 for the remainder of the game, but came up short 38-33 after failing to recover an onside kick with just 2:02 remaining in regulation.

Week 7: at Buffalo Bills

The Buccaneers played a more consistent game, but still came up short in Buffalo. After scoring early in the third quarter, Buffalo took a 17–6 lead. After another Bills field goal, and two touchdown passes from Jameis Winston to rookie tight-end O. J. Howard, the game was tied, 20-20. With just over 3 minutes remaining in regulation, another touchdown pass by Winston, this time a diving catch just inbounds by Mike Evans gave the Buccaneers a 27–20 lead. On the next drive, the Bills drove down the field in three plays to tie the game, aided by an ill-timed 15-yard Unnecessary Roughness penalty by Robert McClain. With 2:20 left in the fourth, a pass from Winston to Adam Humphries was fumbled and recovered by the Bills at Tampa Bay 32-yard line. After running down the clock, the Bills kicked a field goal to win the game. With this loss, the Buccaneers now have lost three straight games, all by less than one score, and sit at 2–4 at the bottom of the NFC South.

Week 8: vs. Carolina Panthers

The Buccaneers drop their fourth straight game in a disappointing loss. The defense improved, while the offense only put up 3 points. With this loss, the Bucs move to 2-5 and are still at the bottom of the NFC South.

Week 9: at New Orleans Saints

The offense once again struggled as the Bucs lost their fifth straight game and their second straight against a division opponent. Jameis Winston sat out of the second half due to an injury and was replaced by Ryan Fitzpatrick. This game was also marred by a brawl on Tampa Bay's sideline in the 3rd quarter when Winston, who was already considered out with the aforementioned injury, went over and pushed Marshon Lattimore in his ear, and Mike Evans suddenly shoved Lattimore from behind to spark the fight; however, there were no ejections.

With this loss, the Bucs move to 2–6. This is the Bucs' longest losing streak since the 2014 season.

Week 10: vs. New York Jets

The Bucs end their five-game losing streak with a win at home against the Jets. With Jameis Winston out with an injury and Mike Evans out due to a one-game suspension earned in the previous game against the Saints, Ryan Fitzpatrick and rookie Chris Godwin got the starts for the Bucs. The only scores came from field goals until the fourth quarter where both teams scored late touchdowns. The Bucs scored first taking a 15–3 lead, then the Jets scored with 38 seconds left, cutting the lead to five points. A failed Jets onside kick sealed a Bucs win.

Week 11: at Miami Dolphins

After originally being slated to play in Week 1, the Bucs and the Dolphins finally met on what should have been each other's bye week. The Bucs win consecutive games for the first time this year with a 30–20 win. The defense created 4 turnovers in the first half, 3 interceptions and one fumble. Ryan Fitzpatrick started once again, finishing with over 270 passing yards and 2 touchdowns. With this win, the Bucs move to 4–6.

Week 12: at Atlanta Falcons

The Bucs go 0–3 in the division with a loss at the Falcons. After going down 27–6 in the third quarter, the Bucs fought back to cut the lead to 27–20. After a turn over on downs, the Falcons scored again to end the game. With this loss, the Bucs fall to 4–7, equaling their loss total from last season.

Week 13: at Green Bay Packers

With the loss, the Bucs exceeded their loss total from the previous season.

Week 14: vs. Detroit Lions

After going down 21–7 in the third, the Bucs fought back to tie the game 21-21. With 20 seconds left, the Lions scored a field goal to secure the win. With this loss, the Bucs were officially mathematically out of the playoffs. This marked the 10th straight season without a playoff appearance.

Week 15: vs. Atlanta Falcons

The Bucs lost their fourth straight game. This marked the first time since 2014 where the Bucs didn't win at least one of the two games against the Falcons. Jameis Winston played, arguably, his best game of the season finishing 27/35 on passes, throwing three touchdowns with no interceptions. A late fourth quarter pass to Adam Humphries brought the Bucs within three points, but kicker Pat Murray missed a 54-yard field goal with 0 seconds remaining to seal the loss. The Bucs move to 4–10 on the season, with the last two games being against division rivals New Orleans and Carolina.

During halftime, former Bucs coach Jon Gruden was inducted into the Buccaneers Ring of Honor. He is best known for leading the Bucs to their first Super Bowl win.

Week 16: at Carolina Panthers

The Bucs drop their fifth straight for the second time this season. With this loss, the Bucs have had 7 of their 11 losses come by 7 points or less.

Week 17: vs. New Orleans Saints

The Bucs finish the season with a win against a division rival. A late 4th quarter touchdown pass from Jameis Winston to rookie wide receiver Chris Godwin with 9 seconds remaining gave the Bucs their first win against a division opponent this year. With this win, the Bucs finish the season 5-11, their sixth losing season in eight years. They went 4–4 in home games and 1–7 in road games. They will pick 7th in the 2018 NFL Draft.

Standings

Division

Conference

Notes

References

External links
 

Tampa Bay
Tampa Bay Buccaneers seasons
Tampa Bay Buccaneers